Zimmer 483 – Live in Europe is a live album and DVD released by the German band Tokio Hotel on 30 November 2007. It was recorded on 2 May 2007 at the Köpi Arena in Oberhausen, Germany during the first leg of their Zimmer 483 Tour.

Track listing

Chart positions

Weekly charts

Year-end charts

Certifications

Video

References

Tokio Hotel live albums
Tokio Hotel video albums
2007 live albums
2007 video albums
German-language live albums
German-language video albums
Live video albums